Paysandú is the capital of Paysandú Department in western Uruguay.

History

It was founded in October 1756 and had acquired the status of "Villa" (town) before the independence of Uruguay. On 8 June 1863, its status was elevated to "Ciudad" (city) by the Act of Ley Nº 780.

General Leandro Gomez led Uruguayan forces to save the town from an invasion by Brazilian forces in 1864–1865. A battle took place on 2 December 1864.

Population
In 2011 Paysandú had a population of 76,412. It is the fourth largest city in Uruguay, after Montevideo, Salto and Ciudad de la Costa.
 
Source: Instituto Nacional de Estadística de Uruguay

Paysandú is more cosmopolitan than most Uruguayan cities, with many settlers from Italy, Switzerland, Poland, Germany, Russia, Ukraine, Belgium and various African nations.

Geography
The city is located on the banks of the Uruguay River, which forms the border with Argentina. As of the census of 2011 it was the fourth-most populated city of the country.

A small distance north of the city is the General Artigas Bridge that links Uruguay with the Entre Ríos Province of Argentina, south of the city Colón.

Climate
Paysandú has a humid subtropical climate, described by the Köppen climate classification as Cfa. Summers are warm to hot and winters are cool, with the occurrence of frosts and fog. The precipitation is evenly distributed throughout the year, although winters are slightly drier, with an average of 1,181 mm (46.5 in), and the annual average temperature is around 19 °C (66 °F).

Economy
The main industries in the city are Norteña brewery, Azucarlito (sugar), Paylana (which is a producer of world-class woolen fabrics), and Paycuero (leather). Paysandú is also the centre of plantation forest industry in Uruguay, with many companies involved in the planting and harvesting of Eucalyptus plantations.

Transportation
The city is served by Tydeo Larre Borges International Airport.

Recreation

Paysandú has some fine recreational beaches on the Uruguay River which have lifeguards during the summer. It is also home to many sporting clubs, including a rowing club, yacht club, and numerous others for football, rugby, hockey, tennis and polo.

Education

Previously the area had a German school, Deutsche Schule Paysandú.

Also the city has a Center of the University of the Republic (Centro Universitario de Paysandú).

Places of worship
 Parish Church of Our Lady of the Rosary and St. Benedict of Palermo (Roman Catholic)
 St. Raymond and St. John Bosco Parish Church (Roman Catholic, Salesians of Don Bosco)
 Sacred Heart of Jesus Parish Church (Roman Catholic)
 St. Joseph the Worker Parish Church (Roman Catholic)

Notable people

Politicians
 Reinaldo Gargano (FA), Foreign Minister of Uruguay (2005–2008) †
 Jorge Larrañaga (PN), current Senator
 Raúl Sendic (FA), Vice-President of Uruguay 2015–2017

Football players
 Sebastián Soria, Qatari football player
 Walter Gargano, football player of Peñarol
 Nicolás Lodeiro, football player of Seattle Sounders FC
 Bosco Frontán, retired footballer who played mostly in Uruguay and Mexico
 Egidio Arévalo Rios, the 10th most capped player for Uruguay with 91, currently with Correcaminos UAT
 Maxi Gómez, football player of Trabzonspor
 Marcelo Saracchi, football player of Levante

Musicians
 Los Iracundos
 Alfredo Eusebio Gobbi, tango musician

Other
 Clotilde Luisi (1882–1969), first woman to study law at the University of the Republic
 Ricardo Armentano, professor and researcher of international repute
 Hiber Conteris (1933-2020), literary critic and playwright

Twinned cities
Hellín, Spain
Muscatine, Iowa, United States
Smara, Western Sahara

See also
 List of diplomatic missions in Uruguay#Consulate in Paysandú

References

External links

Paysandú Portal
Tourist information for nearby Thermal Baths of Guaviú and Almirón
INE map of Paysandú and San Félix

 
Populated places in the Paysandú Department
Uruguay River
Populated places established in 1749
Argentina–Uruguay border crossings
Port cities and towns in Uruguay